Goodman Mazibuko (born 5 April 1975) is a South African former soccer player who played as a midfielder. He played for Free State Stars, Orlando Pirates and Moroka Swallows. He also represented South Africa.

External links

1975 births
Living people
South African soccer players
Soccer players from the Free State (province)
Association football midfielders
Free State Stars F.C. players
Moroka Swallows F.C. players
Orlando Pirates F.C. players
South Africa international soccer players